Hooshmand Aghili is a prominent Iranian singer, best known for his song Farda To Miaei (sometimes spelled Farda to Miayee). Aghili served as one of ten Honorary Judges of the 2005 contest The Search for the Star Musician of Iran, held to identify gifted amateur vocalists and musicians performing Persian traditional music and Iranian folk music. Following the death of Iranian singer Hayedeh, Aghili performed Hayedeh's Sarab as a tribute.

Biography

Discography

Studio albums
 Faal – EP 1992 Pars Video
 Jamal e Janan 2007 Pars Video
 Yar – Persian Music 1997 Caltex Records
 Che Khabar Az Iran 1990 Pars Video
 Live in Concert 2001 Pars Video
 Dokhtarekeh Faal Been 1998 Pars Video
 Darya – Persian Music 1989 Caltex Records
 Yar 1998 Caltex Records
 Eshghe Sharghi (Persian Music) 1997 Caltex Records

References

1937 births
Living people
People from Abadeh
Iranian pop singers
20th-century singers
Iranian male singers
Persian-language singers
20th-century Iranian male singers